Mont Illi or Mont d'Illi is one of four departments in Mayo-Kebbi Est, a region of Chad. Its capital is Fianga.

Departments of Chad
Mayo-Kebbi Est Region